Europass is a European Union (Directorate General for Education and Culture) initiative to increase transparency of qualification and mobility of citizens in Europe. It aims to make a person's skills and qualifications clearly understood throughout Europe (including the European Union, European Economic Area and EU candidate countries).

The five Europass documents are the Curriculum Vitae, Language Passport, Europass Mobility, Certificate Supplement, and Diploma Supplement, sharing a common brand name and logo. Since 2012 individuals have been able to assemble all Europass documents in the European Skills Passport.

Europass web portal 
The European Centre for the Development of Vocational Training (Cedefop) developed and maintains the Europass portal in 27 languages. The portal is the reference resource of information related to the five Europass documents. Its purpose is also to help all users create, with a simple wizard, a personal electronic portfolio containing a curriculum vitae (with motivation letter), a language passport or any other document bringing evidence of skills and qualifications (copies of degrees, work certificates, etc.)

In every country, a National Europass Centre promotes and provides information on the Europass documents.

Europass technical resources

Europass XML schema 
Europass has produced an XML vocabulary to describe the information contained in the CV and Language Passport.  A Europass CV or Language Passport can be saved in Europass XML format or PDF format with the XML attached. Both formats can be imported into the Europass online editors or any other system that understands the Europass XML, ensuring that all information is properly parsed.

Web services 

Europass Web services provide a standard way (web API) for other systems, software, and services to use Europass services in an automated way. An example is the web service which enables the remote generation of Europass documents in PDF, OpenDocument, or Microsoft Word formats, starting from a Europass XML file.

Labels and help texts 

Text labels used for the Europass CV and ELP (European Language Passport) are available in various formats from the Europass website:
 The OASIS XLIFF (XML Localisation Interchange File Format)
 The W3C XForms
 The PO file format is used in the GNU Gettext toolset

Weblog plug-in 

The Directorate General for Education and Culture has co-financed the European project "KITE" under the Leonardo da Vinci programme. KITE offers an implementation of the Europass-CV as a plug-in for the open-source software weblogs WordPress and Dotclear. The plugin allow users of those blogging services to store a Europass CV in all European official languages and export it into the following formats: PDF, ODT, HTML, XHTML, HR-XML. The plugin is compliant with HR-XML SEP specifications. Last version of the plugin has been released in January 2008.

History 
The Europass framework was established by Decision 2241/2004/EC of the European Parliament and of the Council of 15 December 2004 on a single Community framework for the transparency of qualifications and competences (Europass) and entered into force on 1 January 2005 by its own terms.

References

External links 

 
 Europass CV
 National Europass Centres
 Europass interoperability web page
 Decision No 2241/2004/EC of the European Parliament and of the Council of 15 December 2004 on a single Community framework for the transparency of qualifications and competences (Europass)

Recruitment
European Union